Beaufort, also Beaufort-sur-Doron, is a commune in the Savoie department in the Auvergne-Rhône-Alpes region in south-eastern France. It is the namesake for the Beaufort cheese, which is produced in the surrounding area.

Geography

Climate

Beaufort has a oceanic climate (Köppen climate classification Cfb).

See also
Communes of the Savoie department

References

Communes of Savoie
Ceutrones